(born November 22, 1974, in Akita, Akita, Japan) is a former J-pop idol, singer-songwriter and actress. Throughout her career, she released three albums and nine singles.

Biography

Early life
Junko Kawada graduated from Meguro Nihon University Junior High and High School and the Junior College of Kagawa Nutrition University.

Idol career
During her first year in junior high school, Kawada entered an audition hosted by CBS Sony, Fuji TV, and Shueisha. In her second year of junior high school, she left her parents' home and moved to a dormitory that was run by CBS Sony to focus on her singing and dancing lessons until she made her debut at the age of 13.

Kawada finished runner-up on the 2nd Tohato All Raisin Princess Contest in 1987, losing to Hanako Asada. Two years later, she formed the idol unit  with Shinobu Nakayama and Mamiko Tayama. In 1990, Rakutenshi became part of the idol group , which included Rumi Shishido and Lip's. During her career as an idol, Kawada appeared in numerous commercials and recorded anime theme songs.

Retirement and post-career
Kawada retired in 1995 at the age of 20 without any formal announcements and became an office lady for 10 years until she became a middle manager. In 2005, she returned to the entertainment scene as a member of the idol duo Lenpha, under the pseudonym . The duo lasted a year before Kawada finally announced her retirement.

In 2009, Kawada moved to the health and beauty business by opening  under the name . In addition, she expanded her business in Kenya to help create jobs for underprivileged neighborhoods.

In 2013, Kawada recorded the songs "Egao" and "Aitakute" for lyricist Miju, who was fighting a rare illness.

Personal life
Kawada married MMA fighter Shungo Oyama on September 20, 2010. She stood by him at ringside until his retirement in 2014.

Discography

Studio albums

Compilation albums

Singles

References

External links 
 
 
 

1974 births
Japanese idols
Japanese women pop singers
Living people
People from Akita (city)
Musicians from Akita Prefecture
20th-century Japanese women singers
20th-century Japanese singers